Monoclea gottschei is a species of liverwort belonging to the family Monocleaceae.

A study in tropical Ecuador found that Monoclea gottschei was typically not found in urban environments despite being found in a nearby more pristine location, suggesting that the species is sensitive to anthropogenic effects such as the presence of wastewater and heavy metal pollution.

References

Marchantiales
Plants described in 1886
Flora of Ecuador